The Nicholson File Company Mill Complex is a historic industrial manufacturing complex at 1-45 Acorn Street in Providence, Rhode Island.  It consists of 24 buildings occupying  of land, of which 20 are historically significant.  The oldest of the buildings were built in 1865 to designs by William Nicholson, and the complex was regularly expanded over the decades through the early 20th century.  The Nicholson File Company was a major producer of machine-made files, started by William Nicholson in 1859.  The company manufactured precision tools used in the manufacture of armaments during the American Civil War for the Union Army, and closed the plant in 1959.  It has been used by a variety of light industrial concerns since then.

The complex was listed on the National Register of Historic Places in 2005.

See also
National Register of Historic Places listings in Providence, Rhode Island

References

Industrial buildings and structures on the National Register of Historic Places in Rhode Island
Industrial buildings completed in 1864
Buildings and structures in Providence, Rhode Island
National Register of Historic Places in Providence, Rhode Island
1864 establishments in Rhode Island